Verticordia rennieana is a flowering plant in the myrtle family, Myrtaceae and is endemic to the south-west of Western Australia. It is an openly branched shrub with small, narrow, warty leaves and pink and silvery-white flowers in spring and summer.

Description

There are only 5 fertile stamens with groups of 3 staminodes between the stamens. Flowering time is from October to January.

Taxonomy and naming
Verticordia rennieana was first formally described by Ferdinand von Mueller and Ralph Tate in 1896 from a specimen collected by Richard Helms and the description was published in Transactions and proceedings and report, Royal Society of South Australia. The specific epithet (rennieana) honours Edward Henry Rennie.

In his review of the genus in 1991, Alex George placed this species in subgenus Eperephes, section Integripetala along with V. helmsii, V. interioris, V. mirabilis and V. picta.

Distribution and habitat
This verticordia is found in a broad area between Perenjori and Southern Cross where it grows in sand, sometimes with gravel or loam, often with other species of verticordia in the Avon Wheatbelt, Coolgardie and Yalgoo biogeographic regions.

Conservation
 Verticordia rennieana is classified as "Not Threatened" by the Western Australian Government Department of Parks and Wildlife.

Use in horticulture
Although this verticordia is rarely grown in gardens it is described as "a beautiful small shrub ... with honey-perfumed flowers". It is propagated from cuttings and requires a sunny position in well-drained soil.

References

rennieana
Endemic flora of Western Australia
Myrtales of Australia
Rosids of Western Australia
Plants described in 1896
Taxa named by Ferdinand von Mueller